Autobiographie is the 30th French studio album by the French-Armenian singer Charles Aznavour, released in 1980.

History
In 1980 the album became No 5 in France (42 weeks) of France (for 49 weeks).

The album includes songs by Charles Aznavour and Georges Garvarentz. It was reissued by EMI in 1998. One of the songs, Une Vie D'amour performed also in Russian, became a hit.

Track listing (vinyl) 
Side A:
Ça Passe 3:49
Mon Ami, Mon Judas 3:36
Mon Ėmouvant Amour 2:41
Autobiographie 7:05
Side B:
L'Amour Bon Dieu l'Amour 5:19
Allez! Vaï Marseille! 4:07
Je Fantasme 3:39
Le Souvenir de Toi 3:23

Track listing (CD/SACD DSD upsampled)
Un Corps (bonus)
Je Ne Connais Que Toi (bonus)
Ça Passe
Mon Ami, Mon Judas
Mon Ėmouvant Amour
Autobiographie
L'Amour Bon Dieu L'Amour
Allez! Vaï Marseille!
Je Fantasme
Le Souvenir De Toi
Être (bonus)
Rien Moins Que l'Amour (bonus)
Une Vie d'Amour (version 1) (bonus)
Une Vie d'Amour (version 2) (bonus)(Version langue Russe)
Une Vie d'Amour (version 3) (bonus)( Version avec Mireille Mathieu)

Personnel 
Charles Aznavour - Author, Composer, Vocals
Georges Garvarentz - Composer
Directed By – Christian Gaubert, Jean Claudric, Paul Mauriat
Danielle Licari - Vocals

References

Links
Autobiographie (Aznavour)

1980 albums
Charles Aznavour albums